Margaret ‘Madge’ Rainey is a former camogie player, captain of the All Ireland Camogie Championship winning team in 1956. She played in the All Ireland senior final of 1951.

Career
She gave an accomplished in All Ireland semi-final and final in 1951 and was a goalscorer on the Antrim team that shocked Dublin in the 1956 All Ireland semi-final. She played again on the Antrim team that narrowly won the 1957 semi-final against Mayo in Castlebar but was not on the team defeated in the 1957 final.

References

External links
 Camogie.ie Official Camogie Association Website
 Wikipedia List of Camogie players

Living people
Antrim camogie players
Year of birth missing (living people)